Kenneth David Hughes (born 9 January 1966) is a Welsh former professional footballer, who played as a goalkeeper. A product of the Crystal Palace youth squad, he made appearances in the English Football League for Shrewsbury Town and Wrexham. He also played non-league football for Telford United.

References

1966 births
Living people
Sportspeople from Gwynedd
Welsh footballers
Association football goalkeepers
Crystal Palace F.C. players
Shrewsbury Town F.C. players
Wrexham A.F.C. players
Telford United F.C. players
English Football League players